Jonathan Kimmel (born November 4, 1976) is an American television and film director, writer, producer, actor and composer. He is the younger brother of Jimmy Kimmel. He is married to writer and lecturer Carly Hirsch, and is the father of Wesley Kimmel (also known as "The Baby Bachelor") and Beatrix Kimmel.

Early life and career 
Kimmel is an alumnus of Arizona State University's long-running Farce Side Comedy Hour troupe. He also directed, performed and wrote for the show.

Kimmel's writing credits include six seasons of South Park, during which the show won three Emmy Awards and a Peabody Award. He has also contributed several voice-overs, including the voice of his brother Jimmy in the "Fishsticks" episode. After that, he served as co-executive producer and head writer for MTV's The Andy Milonakis Show. Additionally, he assisted on Crank Yankers, where he was also a composer and voice-over performer. Other writing credits include: That's My Bush!, Drawn Together, The Bonnie Hunt Show and The Man Show.

Kimmel's performing credits include: a guest-starring role on Life with Bonnie; the character Xavier on the ABC pilot "Let Go"; the voice of Scab in Disney's The Wild; the Singing Ass in Sarah Silverman's Jesus Is Magic; the voice of the King on Drawn Together; the Boneologist and as The Fog on Minoriteam, as well as dozens of voices and characters on "Jimmy Kimmel Live!". Kimmel has also guest-starred in several roles on The Sarah Silverman Program. He directed the music video for The Killers' ninth charity Christmas single, "Joel the Lump of Coal", which features his brother Jimmy (who also co-wrote the song).

Kimmel currently serves as executive producer and director, on the reboot of Crank Yankers, for Comedy Central.

Personal life 
Kimmel currently resides in Los Angeles, and works as a segment director on "Jimmy Kimmel Live!" (after three years as a writer on the program).

Filmography

Film

Television

References

External links 
 

1976 births
American male film actors
American male television actors
American male voice actors
American people of German descent
American people of Italian descent
American television producers
Arizona State University alumni
Living people